Maleh-e Shirkhan (also Romanized as Maleh-e Shīrkhān and Maleh Shīrkhān) is a village in Ghaleh Rural District, Zagros District, Chardavol County, Ilam Province, Iran. At the 2006 census, its population was 41, in 9 families. The village is populated by Kurds.

References 

Populated places in Chardavol County
Kurdish settlements in Ilam Province